Wendy Coakley-Thompson (nee, Wendy Cecille Thompson; born December 27, 1966), is a mainstream fiction author. Coakley-Thompson's work is part of emerging millennial contemporary African-American literature. Coakley-Thompson's fiction addresses themes and issues concerning interracial relationships, race, racial identity, and people of mixed race.

Early life and education
Wendy Cecille Thompson was born on December 27, 1966, in Brooklyn.
Her Bahamian parents were Frederick Oliver Wendell Thompson (1929–1982) and Marina Thompson (née Coakley).
Coakley-Thompson was raised in Nassau, Bahamas. 
She lived in Montclair, New Jersey, for over a decade.

Coakley-Thompson has a BA in Speech and Theater (Broadcasting) from Montclair State College in Upper Montclair, New Jersey; an MA in Communication Arts from William Paterson College in Wayne, New Jersey; and a PhD in Education (Instructional Design, Development, and Evaluation) from Syracuse University in Syracuse, New York. Coakley-Thompson's dissertation, written in 1999 in partial fulfilment of the PhD degree is entitled:
The Use of Popular Media in Multicultural Education: Stressing Implications for the Black/Non-Black biracial student.

Career
In December 2006, Rainy Friday Films, a Chicago-based independent production company, optioned the film rights to What You Won't Do for Love, Coakley-Thompson's second novel. From February 2007 until October 2007, Coakley-Thompson co-hosted The Book Squad on WMET1160 with author Karyn Langhorne.

Publications 
Back to Life (2004)
What You Won't Do for Love (2005)
Triptych (2008)
Writing While Black (2012)

See also
Bahamian American
List of romantic novelists
List of novelists from the United States

References

External links 
Wendy Coakley-Thompson Official Web Site
Writing While Blog

1966 births
Living people
American women bloggers
American bloggers
21st-century American novelists
American romantic fiction writers
American people of Bahamian descent
Bahamian novelists
Bahamian women writers
Montclair State University alumni
Writers from Brooklyn
People from Montclair, New Jersey
Syracuse University alumni
William Paterson University alumni
African-American novelists
Women romantic fiction writers
American women novelists
21st-century American women writers
Novelists from New York (state)
21st-century African-American women writers
21st-century African-American writers
20th-century African-American people
20th-century African-American women